Myton may refer to:

Places
Myton, Hull, originally a separate village and once a parish in Kingston-Upon-Hull 
Myton, Utah, city in Duchesne County, Utah, United States
Myton-on-Swale, a village in North Yorkshire
Myton, Warwickshire, a suburb of Warwick
Myton, town centre of Ingleby Barwick, North Yorkshire

Other uses
 Myton in Greek mythology, demigod son of Poseidon by Mytilene, daughter of Macareus.
Myton (surname)

See also 
Mitton (disambiguation)
Battle of Myton (1319), in North Yorkshire
Myton School, a school in Warwickshire
Mytton (disambiguation)